The Center for Global Studies (CGS) was founded in 2000 by Prof. Edward Kolodziej at the University of Illinois at Urbana–Champaign (UIUC). CGS serves as a resource for faculty, students, staff, and the public on global studies. CGS is also responsible for globalizing the research, teaching, and outreach missions of UIUC. In 2019, the Center became part of the Illinois Global Institute, which was established in 2019.

Steven Witt has served as the Director of the Center for Global Studies since 2015.

CGS has been a National Resource Center, as designated by the U.S. Department of Education, since 2003. CGS is also a member of the Global Studies Consortium.

Globalizing missions of the Center for Global Studies
 Promote and support innovative research to better understand global issues confronting the world’s populations and identify ways to resolve these challenges.
 Partner with colleges and faculty to develop new courses and degree programs in global studies.
 Foster interdisciplinary and interprofessional cooperation in global studies.
 Facilitate deep understanding of the values, thinking, practices, and aspirations of the world’s diverse cultures, and the acquisition of advanced language skills in Less Commonly Taught Languages.
 Develop teaching resources, professional training opportunities, and public programs in global studies for researchers, educators, students, business leaders, media, governmental agencies, civic organizations, and members of the public.

References

University of Illinois Urbana-Champaign centers and institutes
International relations education
Global studies research
2000 establishments in Illinois